Alexandre Brasseur (born Alexandre Espinasse; 29 March 1971) is a French actor. He was born in Neuilly-sur-Seine, the son of actor Claude Brasseur, the grandson of actor Pierre Brasseur and actress Odette Joyeux and great-grandson of Jules Brasseur.

Filmography
Le Souper (1992)
Les Ténors (1993)
Le plus beau pays du monde (1998)
La courte-échelle (1999), with Serge Lama. Short film directed by Thierry Poirier, based on a short story by Gédéon Picot
Maigret (TV series) (from 1999 to 2002), as Inspector Paul Lachenal
Le Mal de vivre (2002)
La Bataille d'Hernani (TV, 2002)
La Liberté de Marie (2002)
Les Thibault (TV, 2003)
Les Textiles (2004)
Malabar Princess (2004)
Le plus beau jour de ma vie (2004)
Quand les anges s'en mêlent (2004)
Jaurès (téléfilm 2005)
Le Juge est une femme (TV, 2005)
La Croisière (2011)
La Maison des Rocheville (TV, 2010)
 Colt 45 (2014)Joséphine, ange gardien (TV, 2016)The Collection (TV, 2016)
Demain nous appartient (TV, 2017 - now)

 Theatre 

 1995 : Viens chez moi j'habite chez une copine by Didier Kaminka and Luis Rego, directed by Jean-Luc Moreau, Théâtre Rive Gauche
 1996 : Crime et châtiment (Crime and Punishment) by Fiodor Dostoïevski, directed by Jean-Claude Idée, Théâtre Mouffetard
 1997 : Cyrano de Bergerac by Edmond Rostand, directed by Jérôme Savary, Théâtre national de Chaillot
 1999 : La Cerisaie (The Cherry Orchard) by Anton Tchekhov, directed by Georges Wilson, Espace Pierre Cardin 
 2000 : Joyeuses Pâques by Jean Poiret, directed by Bernard Murat, Théâtre des Variétés
 2005 : La Locandiera (The Mistress of the Inn) by Carlo Goldoni, directed by Alain Sachs, Théâtre Antoine
 2007 - 2008 : Mon père avait raison by Sacha Guitry, directed by Bernard Murat, Théâtre Édouard VII
 2011 : De filles en aiguilles (Shady Business) by Robin Hawdon, adapted by Stewart Vaughan and Jean-Christophe Barc, directed by Jacques Décombe, Théâtre de la Michodière
 2013 : Toutes les dates de naissance et de mort by Régis de Martrin-Donos, directed by Gilbert Désveaux, tour
 2013 : Crime sans ordonnance (Prescription:Murder) by William Link and Richard Levinson, adapted by Pierre Sauvil, directed by Didier Caron, tour
 2014 : Georges et Georges by Éric-Emmanuel Schmitt, directed by Steve Suissa, Théâtre Rive Gauche
 2016 : Brasseur et les Enfants du paradis by and directed by Daniel Colas, Festival de Figeac followed by tour then Théâtre du Petit-Saint-Martin 
 2019 : Les Funambules'' by and directed by Daniel Colas, festival off - Avignon

References

External links
 Official website

1971 births
Living people
French male film actors
French male television actors
20th-century French male actors
21st-century French male actors
People from Neuilly-sur-Seine
French male stage actors